Yasso may refer to:

 Yasso, Burkina Faso
Yasso, Mali